James Greig JP (born 1834) was second Chief Manager of the Hongkong & Shanghai Banking Corporation and member of the Legislative Council of Hong Kong. Greig was the Hong Kong branch manager of the Asiatic Banking Corporation before he joined the Hongkong & Shanghai Banking Corporation in 1869. 

He acted as Chief Manager of the Bank in 1871 when Victor Kresser retired and later on assumed the post officially from 1871 to 1876. He was responsible for handling the first public loan by the Qing government in 1874. He committed to the bank to a Fuzhou loan of £27,615 at the agreed but arbitrary exchange rate of 2 million taels, denominated in sterling. He retired from the Chief Manager in 1876 and was succeeded by Thomas Jackson.

Greig was appointed member of the Legislative Council of Hong Kong in February 1872 when Henry John Ball acted as Chief Justice and was made Justice of the Peace in March 1872. He was also elected Trustee of Hong Kong's St John's Anglican Cathedral.

References

1834 births
British bankers
British expatriates in Hong Kong
Hong Kong bankers
Hong Kong justices of the peace
HSBC people
Members of the Legislative Council of Hong Kong
Year of death missing